Charles Hopkins is the name of:
Charles Hopkins (poet) (c. 1664–c. 1700), Anglo-Irish poet and dramatist
Charles Gordon Hopkins (1822–1886), politician of the Hawaiian Kingdom
Charles Ferren Hopkins (1842–1934), Union Civil War soldier and of Medal of Honor awardee
Charles Jerome Hopkins (1836–1898), US musician
(Edwin) Charles Hopkins (1905-1968), composer, church organist, music teacher, lecturer and (from 1959) Church of England clergyman
Charles Hopkins (died 1805), first husband of Eliza Poe
Charles F. Hopkins, Confederate Civil War leader at the Battle of Saint John's Bluff
Charles Hopkins, mathematician known for his role in the Hopkins–Levitzki theorem

See also
Hopkins (surname)